The following is an episode list for the crime fiction television series Columbo. After two pilot episodes, the show originally aired on NBC from 1971 to 1978 as one of the rotating programs of The NBC Mystery Movie. Columbo then aired less frequently on ABC beginning in 1989. The last installment was broadcast in 2003.

Because the Columbo episodes from 1989 to 2003 aired infrequently, different DVD sets have been released around the world. In Region 2 and 4, all episodes have now been released as 10 seasons, with the 10th season covering the last 14 episodes from "Columbo Goes to College" (1990) to the most recent, "Columbo Likes the Nightlife" (2003). In France and the Netherlands (also Region 2), however, the DVDs were released as 12 seasons. In Region 1, all episodes from season 8 are grouped differently; all the episodes that were originally aired on ABC were released as the COLUMBO: The Mystery Movie Collection. For the sake of clarity, all episodes in this article are arranged as they appear in the UK release.

Series overview

Episodes

Pilot episodes
Before Peter Falk was cast in the role of Columbo, Bert Freed played the character in "Enough Rope", a 1960 episode of The Chevy Mystery Show, a TV anthology series. In 1962, that episode became a stage play titled Prescription: Murder (starring Thomas Mitchell as Columbo, Joseph Cotten and Agnes Moorehead as Roy and Claire Flemming, and Patricia Medina as Flemming's mistress). 

The play was adapted to a made-for-TV movie in 1968, with Falk debuting in the role. In this made-for-TV movie, Columbo—rather than making the rumpled presentation that later became the character's trademark—is less shabbily dressed, wearing suits, shorter hair, and heavier stage makeup. He carries a raincoat, which would become a staple. He wears the raincoat in most of the scenes. He also appears somewhat more aggressive when confronting suspects.

Season 1 (1971–72)

Season 2 (1972–73)

Season 3 (1973–74)

Season 4 (1974–75)

Season 5 (1975–76)

Season 6 (1976–77)

Season 7 (1977–78)

Season 8 (1989)

Season 9 (1989–90)

Season 10 and specials (1990–2003)

Repeat offenders
Here is a list of the actors who starred as more than one murderer:

Patrick McGoohan starred in four episodes as the murderer: By Dawn's Early Light (Emmy Award) (1974), Identity Crisis (also directed) (1975), Agenda for Murder (Emmy Award) (also directed) (1990), and Ashes to Ashes (also directed (and co-wrote - uncredited)) (1998). He also directed two additional episodes: "Last Salute to the Commodore" (1976) and "Murder With Too Many Notes" (also co-wrote) (2001).
Jack Cassidy starred in three episodes as the murderer: Murder by the Book (1971), Publish or Perish (1974), and Now You See Him... (1976).
Robert Culp starred in three episodes as the murderer: Death Lends a Hand (1971, filmed at Marion Davies estate), The Most Crucial Game (1972), and Double Exposure (1973). He also appeared in one episode as the father of the murderer: Columbo Goes to College (1990).
George Hamilton starred in two episodes as the murderer: A Deadly State of Mind (1975) and Caution: Murder Can Be Hazardous to Your Health (1991).
William Shatner starred in two episodes as the murderer: Fade in to Murder (1976) and Butterfly in Shades of Grey (1994). He also did a voiceover in Double Exposure (1974).
Martin Landau starred in one episode in a double role as identical twin brothers who committed murder together: Double Shock (1973).

Some actors starred as the murderer in one episode and played supporting roles in other episodes:

Though not a repeat murderer, Robert Vaughn starred in two episodes: once as the murderer in Troubled Waters (1975), and once as the victim in Last Salute to the Commodore (1976).
Similarly, Ray Milland appeared as a murderer in The Greenhouse Jungle (1972) and the husband of the victim in Death Lends a Hand (1971).
Fred Draper appeared as the murderer in Last Salute to the Commodore (1976) and appeared in supporting roles in Lady in Waiting (1971), Lovely but Lethal (1973), Negative Reaction (1974), A Deadly State of Mind (1975), and Fade in to Murder (1976).
Patrick O'Neal played the murderer in Blueprint for Murder (1972), and appeared in Make Me a Perfect Murder (1978).
Joyce Van Patten starred in Old Fashioned Murder (1976) as the murderer, and played a minor supporting role in Negative Reaction (1974).
Dabney Coleman appeared as the murderer in Columbo and the Murder of a Rock Star (1991),  and also appeared in Double Shock (1973).
Ed Begley Jr played the murderer in Undercover (1994) and played Officer Stein in How to Dial a Murder (1978).
Tyne Daly starred in A Bird in the Hand as co-murderer Dolores McCain (1992) and Undercover as the supporting character Dorothea McNally (1994).
Although did not kill anyone Shera Danese plays a disgruntled wife who assists to a murder in A Trace of Murder (1997). She also appeared in five more episodes as supporting characters.

References

Further reading

External links
 IMDb list of episodes

Episodes
Lists of American crime drama television series episodes